The Brazz Brothers, alias Brazz Bros (established 1981 in Langevåg, Sula, Norway) is a Norwegian jazz band. They are particularly known for their improvisations, and for the cooperation with Lester Bowie.

Biography 
Brazz Brothers was initiated by the brothers Jarle, Jan Magne and Helge Førde, together with the brothers Runar and Stein Erik Tafjord in 1981 as a pure Brass Quintet. They had played together in «Langevåg Skulekorps». The Førde brothers had already been part of «Ytre Suløens Jassensemble» in 1976 at Jazz & Heritage Festival in New Orleans, USA first Norwegian jazz band.

In 1985 the Norwegian drum legend Egil «Bop» Johansen (1934–1998) joined the band, and together they played more than 1200 concerts. After his demise Marcus Lewin from Eskilstuna, Sweden was asked to be his successor. In the period 1990–1995, they had an extensive tour with the American trumpet star Lester Bowie.

In 1986 The Brazz Brothers started the recording of their first album, Brazzy Landscapes, the start of a unique music history. The album comprised the band's own compositions and arrangements, with the appearance of the British singer Phil Minton.
The music is a unique mixture of traditional and contemporary jazz combined with traditional folk music from different parts of the world, with strong representation from the Scandinavian folk tradition. The band has released several albums with great legends and also lesser known but highly talented musicians. They have toured both in Norway and internationally, in the US, Africa, Asia and large parts of Europe, and deliver more than 120 concerts a year. All members also conducted a number of solo projects.

Many school band members throughout Norway have been acquainted with the group throughout their course in learning to play without notes, which the group holds both for beginners, advanced, professional and music educators both in and out of Norway.

Band members

Present members 
Jarle Førde - trumpet & flugelhorn
Jan Magne Førde - trumpet & flygelhorn
Runar Tafjord - French horn
Helge Førde - trombone
Stein Erik Tafjord - tuba
Kenneth Ekornes - drums (2009–)

Past members 
Egil «Bop» Johansen - drums (1985–1998)
Marcus Lewin - drums (1998–2009)

Honors 
Gammleng-prisen 2007 i klassen jazz
The first Sildajazz-prisen 2000

Discography 
1987: Brazzy Landscapes
1989: Live at Oslo Jazz House
1992: Norwegian Air (Norsk Plateproduksjon)
1993: AfroBrazz (Norsk Plateproduksjon)
1994: All Included
1995: Julefergå (Norske Gram)
1996: The Brazz Brothers and Dutch Marine Band
1996: Brazzy Voices (In+Out Records), with Lester Bowie
1997: Roll Tide Roll
1998: New Orleans Parade | Towards The Sea
1999: Ngoma (BrazzRecords)
2000: Aftenvind (BrazzRecords), with Povl Dissing
2001: Aquarium (BrazzRecords)
2003: Live in Cape Town (BrazzRecords)
2004: African Marketplace (BrazzRecords), with «Kongelige Norske Marines Musikkorps»
2004: Rosalina (BrazzRecords), with Povl Dissing & Benny Andersen
2007: Vågåblot (BrazzRecords), with «Vågå Spelmannslag»

Television 
1995: Julefergå Julekalender

References

External links 

Norwegian jazz ensembles
Brass bands
Musical groups established in 1981
1981 establishments in Norway
Musical groups from Møre og Romsdal
Musicians from Langevåg